Melanostomias melanopogon is a species of fish from the Stomiidae family and the Stomiiformes order. The species can be found in the deep waters of the Eastern and Western Atlantic.

References 

Stomiidae
Fish of the Atlantic Ocean
Fish described in 1930